The Balfour Formation is a geological formation that is found in the Beaufort Group, a major geological group that forms part of the greater Karoo Supergroup in South Africa. The Balfour Formation is the uppermost formation of the Adelaide Subgroup which contains all the Late Permian-aged biozones of the Beaufort Group. Outcrops and exposures of the Balfour Formation are found from east of 24 degrees in the highest mountainous escarpments between Beaufort West and Fraserburg, but most notably in the Winterberg and Sneeuberg mountain ranges near Cradock, the Baviaanskloof river valley, Graaff-Reniet and Nieu Bethesda in the Eastern Cape, and in the southern Free State province.

Geology 
The Balfour Formation overlies the Middleton Formation of the Adelaide Subgroup and underlies the Katberg Formation of the lower Tarkastad Subgroup, all comprising the greater Beaufort Group. The Balfour Formation is composed of five members which are listed below (from oldest to youngest):

 Oudeberg Member
 Daggaboersnek Member
 Ripplemead Member 
 Elandsberg Member
 Palingkloof member 
 
The rocks of the Balfour Formation also incorporate the entire Daptocephalus Assemblage Zone, the lowermost portion of the Lystrosaurus Assemblage Zone, and the uppermost rocks of the Cistecephalus Assemblage Zone. Up until the middle section of the Ripplemead Member, the Balfour Formation correlates with the near contemporaneous Teekloof Formation west of the 24 degrees from Beaufort West westwards, and to the Normadien Formation north of the Orange River. However, the Elandsberg and Palingkloof Members do not have any lateral correlates west of 24 degrees. This is either due to past erosion of the upper, unknown members of the Teekloof Formation or there was a sudden cessation of sedimentary deposition in the western section of the Karoo Basin.

The sedimentary rocks of this formation are composed predominantly of alternating greenish-grey, bluish-grey, and grey-ish red mudstone that often contain siltstone lenses. The mudstones are very fine-grained, massive and exhibit blocky weathering. Claystone successions are also found which, along with the mudstones, frequently contain desiccation cracks, raindrop impressions, and calcareous nodules or concretions are found throughout. Rhythmites are also found. Sandstones are less common, but some notable units have been studied in the Balfour Formation. In the lowermost section of the Balfour is a sandstone-rich unit known as the Oudeberg Member. The sandstones in this unit are very fine-grained and are rich in feldspar. Another sandstone unit in the middle of the Balfour Formation is the Daggaboersnek Member which contains thin, tabular sandstones, and ripple structures are common.

The presence of these rocks reveal much about the past environment that they were deposited in. The dominance of fine-grained mudstone and less common, fine-grained sandstones indicates that the rock sediments were deposited in a low-energy, fluvial environment, most likely one that had meandering rivers. At the time of sedimentary deposition, the Karoo retroarc foreland system was in an overfilled phase, and purely terrestrial sediments occupied the Karoo Basin at this time. As this formation includes the rocks of both the Cistecephalus, Daptocephalus, Lystrosaurus Assemblage Zones, the Balfour Formation preserves the geological record for the end Permian extinction event. This is important as the end Permian extinction event was the largest mass extinction event in the Earth’s history. This was followed by one of the worst biotic crises, which is reflected in the sudden and drastic sedimentary facies changes in the overlying Katberg Formation.

Paleontology 

Where the Balfour Formation deposits correlate with the Daptocephalus Assemblage Zone, a great diversity of vertebrate fauna are found. This richness in species diversity observed in the Balfour Formation is especially true of dicynodonts as numerous different species of this successful, herbivorous therapsid have been recovered. Various species of burnetiamorph biarmosuchians, rubidgeine gorgonopsians, and therocephalian species such as Moschorhinus kitchingi and the earliest cynodont, Charassognathus gracilis, also appear. Parareptile species, namely captorhinids, the Younginiforme Youngina capensis, and a variety of temnospondyl amphibians, fishes, and plant fossils such as Glossopteris are likewise found. Glossopteris fossils or leaf impressions are particularly common in the Daggaboersnek Member. The uppermost unit of the Balfour Formation marks the Permian-aged side of the Permian-Triassic boundary. At this point in the biostratigraphy there is a marked drop in species diversity as the Permian-Triassic extinction event began to take its course at the time of sediment deposition.

Correlation
The Balfour Formation is known to corresponds in age with the Cis-Uralian fauna of Russia and the Sanga do Cabral Formation, Paraná Basin of Brazil. Correlations with other Late Permian - Early Triassic deposits abroad remain inconclusive.

References 

Geologic formations of South Africa
Permian System of Africa
Permian South Africa
Sandstone formations
Shale formations
Deltaic deposits
Beaufort Group
Carboniferous southern paleotemperate deposits
Permian southern paleotemperate deposits
Lagerstätten
Fossiliferous stratigraphic units of Africa
Paleontology in South Africa
Geography of the Eastern Cape
Geography of the Northern Cape
Geography of the Western Cape